The 2006 Kremlin Cup women's doubles took place the week of October 9, 2006 in Moscow, Russia.

Seeds

Draw

References

Kremlin Cup
Kremlin Cup